Zhanlan Road Subdistrict, or Zhanlanlu Subdistrict is a subdistrict in the northwest portion of Xicheng District, Beijing, China. In 2020 its population is 114,831.

This subdistrict got its name due to the Beijing Exhibition Center within it.

History

Administrative Division 
As of 2021, there are a total of 22 communities in the subdistrict:

Landmark 

 Beijing Zoo
 Beijing Exhibition Center
 Zhalan Cemetery
 Beijing Planetarium

External links 
 Official website (Archived)

References 

Xicheng District
Subdistricts of Beijing